American Securities LLC is an American private equity firm based in New York with an office in Shanghai that invests in market-leading North American companies with annual revenues generally ranging from $200 million to $2 billion and/or $50 million to $250 million of EBITDA.  American Securities and its affiliates have approximately $23 billion under management. American Securities traces its roots to a family office founded in 1947 by William Rosenwald, the son of Julius Rosenwald , the longtime owner of Sears, Roebuck and Co.

History
William Rosenwald—who had inherited the Rosenwald fortune from his father Julius Rosenwald—founded American Securities Capital Partners in 1947.

In 1993 Michael G. Fisch became the William Rosenwald family's financial advisor.

In 1994—with Fisch as Director and CEO—American Securities opened their first fund to outside investors. By 2012 they had invested in "39 companies in a wide variety of industries, including industrial manufacturing, specialty chemicals, aerospace and defense, energy, business services, healthcare, media, restaurants, and consumer products."

In June 2009, American Securities Capital Partners officially changed its name to American Securities LLC.  As of February 2021, American Securities and its affiliates had approximately $23 billion under management. American Securities has invested in 67 companies across a variety of industries.  As of February 2021, American Securities is currently partnered with 21 companies that have 109,900 collective employees worldwide.

Affiliates

 Ascribe Capital is an affiliate of American Securities LLC that manages approximately $2 billion of long-term capital focused on investing in the debt, and sometimes equity, securities of middle-market companies.

Current investments
Investments as of 2021:
Acuren
Air Methods
Amentum
Aspen Dental
BELFOR
Blount International
Blue Bird
 Conair
Chromaflo Technologies
CPM
Emerald Performance Materials
FleetPride
Foundation Building Materials
Global Tel Link (GTL)
Henry Company
Hexion
Learning Care Group
Milk Specialities Global
MW Industries
North American Partners in Anesthesia
Prince
Ulterra Drilling Technologies
United PF

Previous investments
Previous investments as of 2021.
Advanced Drainage Systems
Anthony International
Arizona Chemical
Cambridge International
Caribbean Restaurants
Community Pacific Broadcasting
CTB International
Delphi Midstream Partners
Dr. Leonard's Healthcare
El Pollo Loco
Fairmount Santrol
FiberMark
Frontier Spinning Mills
General Chemical
Grede
GT Technologies
Healthy Directions
HHI
Ketema, Inc.
Lakeside Energy
Liberty Tire Recycling
MECS
Metaldyne
Metaldyne Performance Group
Miltex Instrument Company
Mortgage Contracting Services
MVE
NEP Broadcasting
Oreck Corporation
PDM Bridge
Potbelly Sandwich Works
Presidio
Press Ganey
Primary Energy Ventures
Robertson Fuel Systems
Royal Adhesives and Sealants
SeaStar Solutions
SpecialtyCare
Tekni-Plex
TNP Enterprises
Unifrax Corporation
Unison Site Management
United Distribution Group
VUTEk
Weasler Engineering
Westward

Controversies
American Securities owns Global Tel*Link Corporation (GTL) which in 2015 had a 50% share in the $1.2 billion prison inmate telecommunications services including the controversial Inmate Calling Service (ICS). With prisoners in 2012 paying up to $17 for a 15-minute call, the Federal Communications Commission scrutinized the industry. In 2015 GTL sought judicial review of the FCC's regulation order aimed at lowering the cost of ICS.

References

External links
Official website

Private equity firms of the United States
Companies based in New York City
Financial services companies established in 1994
1994 establishments in New York City